"I Wanna Go Crazy" is a song recorded by French disc jockey, David Guetta. It features guest vocals by American rapper, will.i.am from The Black Eyed Peas and was released digitally on 24 August 2009 worldwide. It also appeared on Guetta's fourth studio album, One Love.

Track listing

Chart performance

Release history

References

2009 singles
David Guetta songs
Songs written by David Guetta
Songs written by Sandy Vee
Songs written by will.i.am
2009 songs
Virgin Records singles
EMI Records singles
Songs written by Jean-Claude Sindres
Song recordings produced by David Guetta